Stank Hall is a historic building in Beeston, a suburb of Leeds in England. It was built in the late 15th century for the Beeston family.  It has been listed as Grade II by English Heritage since 19 October 1951. Immediately to the north stands a Grade II*–listed barn of the late 15th – early 16th century that was also built for the Beeston family and was acquired by the Hodgson family in the 17th century. In 2014, the barn was acquired from the Leeds City Council by the Friends of Stank Hall Barn, with the intent of restoring it.

References

External links
 Friends of Stank Hall Barn website

Buildings and structures in Leeds
Buildings and structures completed in the 16th century
Grade II listed buildings in West Yorkshire